ISO 5428:1984, Greek alphabet coded character set for bibliographic information interchange, is an ISO standard for an 8-bit character encoding for the modern Greek language. It contains a set of 73 graphic characters and is available through UNIMARC. In practice it is now superseded by Unicode.

Character set

See also
Greek Alphabet
ISO/IEC 8859-7

Notes

References
ISO 5428:1984 "Greek alphabet coded character set for bibliographic information interchange"
MARC 21 Specifications for Record Structure, Character Sets, and Exchange Media > Character Sets > Part 3: Code Tables (Character Sets) > Code Table 8: Greek
"Greek Character Tables: ISO 5428-1980"
"Greek alphabet coded character set for bibliographic information interchange" (June 1, 1982)
"Greek alphabet character set for bibliographic use" (August 13, 1976; older standard)

05428
Character sets